Long Lake Township may refer to the following townships in the United States:

 Long Lake Township, Grand Traverse County, Michigan
 Long Lake Township, Crow Wing County, Minnesota
 Long Lake Township, Watonwan County, Minnesota
 Long Lake Township, Burleigh County, North Dakota

See also 
 Long Lake (disambiguation)

Township name disambiguation pages